Lunari is a surname. Notable people with the surname include:

Luigi Lunari (1934–2019), Italian playwright
Ricardo Lunari (born 1970), Argentine football manager and former player